Martha Bablitch (née Virtue; October 28, 1944 – April 4, 2007) was a judge on the Wisconsin Court of Appeals.

Biography
Martha Jean Virtue was born on October 28, 1944 in Lawrence, Kansas to John and Maxine (née Boord) Virtue. Martha grew up in Ypsilanti, Michigan where her mother was a lawyer and her father an English professor at Eastern Michigan University. She moved to Wisconsin to attend Lawrence University and later graduated from the University of Wisconsin Law School.

Career 
Bablitch practiced private law with the firm Bablitch & Bablitch in Stevens Point, Wisconsin. In the 1970s she was a board member for the Wisconsin state Council on Criminal Justice. She was elected to the Wisconsin Court of Appeals for district 4 when it was created in 1978 and re-elected in 1982. She retired in 1985.

Personal life and death
She was married to William A. Bablitch, who was a member of the Wisconsin State Senate and Wisconsin Supreme Court. They divorced in 1978.

After her retirement, Bablitch devoted her time to the alcohol recovery community in Madison, focusing on other women and lawyers working towards recovery. In April 1986, Bablitch was interviewed in Milwaukee Magazine where she discussed her struggles with depression and alcoholism. On March 17, 2004 her portrait, along with 14 other Wisconsin Women Jurists, was exhibited at the Wisconsin state house of representatives.

She died from lung cancer on April 4, 2007 at her home in Waunakee, Wisconsin.

External links 

 Martha Bablitch; Wisconsin Historical Society Archives.
 Opinions Authored by Bablitch; Court of Appeals of Wisconsin
 Martha J. Virtue Bablitch; Find A Grave
 The Search for Normal. Milwaukee Magazine. April 1986.

References

People from Lawrence, Kansas
People from Ypsilanti, Michigan
People from Stevens Point, Wisconsin
People from Waunakee, Wisconsin
Wisconsin Court of Appeals judges
Wisconsin lawyers
Lawrence University alumni
University of Wisconsin Law School alumni
1944 births
2007 deaths
Deaths from lung cancer in Wisconsin
20th-century American judges
20th-century American women judges
Alcoholics Anonymous
20th-century American lawyers
21st-century American women